GoldenSource Corporation, formerly known as "Financial Technologies International," is a global software company in the enterprise data management industry, founded in 1984 and headquartered in New York City, United States, with offices in London, Mumbai, Milan, Melbourne, and Hong Kong.

Most employees the company hires are from New York University; 10.7% of its employees attended NYU.

Products and services
GoldenSource provides enterprise data management solutions to domestic and international asset managers, banks, investment banks, broker-dealers, mutual fund companies, insurance companies, and global custodians, exchanges and depositories. The capabilities of GoldenSource cover the mastering of all types of capital markets data, including: Securities, entities, customers, products, positions and transactions, corporate actions, pricing and market and risk data.

Typical uses of the software include: Product control, P&L attribution, IPV, client onboarding, solvency II, MiFID II, FRTB, BCBS 239 and other regulations. Financial institutions use GoldenSource software to achieve a central reliable source of data for use across trading, risk and finance.

Clients and partners
Many of GoldenSource's clients include large and mid-sized financial services companies on both the buy side and sell side. They partner with a number of technology and services providers.

EDM Council
GoldenSource is one of the founding members and sponsors of the EDM Council.

References

Companies based in New York City
American companies established in 1984
Financial services companies established in 1984
Financial services companies of the United States
Software companies based in New York (state)
Business software companies
Software companies of the United States
1984 establishments in New York City
1984 establishments in the United States
Companies established in 1984